Johnny McKenna (6 June 1926 – 1980) was a professional footballer who played mainly for Huddersfield Town during the 1940s and 1950s. He also gained 7 caps for Northern Ireland.

References

External links 
Newcastle Fans profile

1926 births
1980 deaths
Association footballers from Belfast
Association footballers from Northern Ireland
Northern Ireland international footballers
Association football midfielders
English Football League players
Linfield F.C. players
Huddersfield Town A.F.C. players
Blackpool F.C. players
Southport F.C. players
Pre-1950 IFA international footballers
Ireland (IFA) wartime international footballers